The Dischma is a valley on the territory of the Swiss municipality of Davos. It is documented as decimata in the 12th century.

Location 

Dischma is the average of the three long, gently sloping, parallel alpine valleys stretching southeast from the Davos plateau toward the Engadin.  Its north-eastern neighbour is the Flüela; its southwestern neighbour is the Sertig valley.  The Dischma valley is drained by the Dischmabach.  The valley floor is at an altitude of about 1500–2000 meters.  The most important side valleys are the Rüedisch Tälli and Rinertälli.

Settlements 
In the valley, there are several small settlements and alpine pastures.  Among the most important are, in order from the bottom to the top of the valley: In den Büelen, Wildi, Uf den Chaiseren, In den Stücken, Stillberg, Hof, Teufi, Boden, Gadmen, Am Rin, Grossalp and Dürrboden.

These settlements form the Dischma neighborhood of the sub-municipality of Davos Platz.

Passes and glaciers 
This pass was important in the Late Middle Ages and the Early Modern Period for the import of wine from the Valtellina valley to Davos. At the top of the valley, we find the Scaletta Glacier between Piz Grialetsch and Scalettahorn.

Surrounding mountains 
Important mountains on the Flüela side are Schwarzhorn, Piz Radönt, Sentischhorn and Baslersch Chopf.  Mountains on the Sertig side include Bocktenhorn, Jatzhorn and the Jakobshorn, which is surrounded by ski lifts.

The Dischma and Sertig valleys are also starting points for a multi-day hike to the Piz Kesch, which is an ultra prominent peak, that is, a peak with a topographic prominence of over 1500 meters.  The hike trail leads from the Dischma valley to the Keschhütte and around the mountain.

Public transport 
Bus 13 of the Davos municipal transport company runs a regular service from Davos to Dürrboden.

Footnotes 

Valleys of Europe
Valleys of Switzerland
Valleys of Graubünden